Maria Elsa da Rocha (1924-2007) was a Goan short-story writer and poet in Portuguese.

Life

Maria Elsa da Rocha was a school teacher by profession, which took her all over Goa (and Damão). The experiences she accrued would feed into her stories, which were also often based on hearsay and anecdotes.

Works

Throughout the 1960s, Rocha contributed short stories to the Margão-based Portuguese language newspaper A Vida, in which she co-edited a cultural page together, and the Portuguese-language programme 'Renascença' broadcast on All-India Radio.

In 2005 a collection of her short stories appeared under the title Vivências Partilhadas [Shared Lives].

Vivências Partilhadas

Vivências Partilhadas provides widest range of representations of the Goan subaltern in Portuguese-language Goan literature post-1961, with a particular focus on the experiences of women, though this deep-seated sympathy at times appears to be at cross-purposes with a certain social conservatism. Rocha's writing is notable for the use she makes of particularly Goan-inflected Portuguese and the considerable use of Konkani in her dialogues.

References

4. Cielo G. Festino "Sharing Lives in Maria Elsa Da Rocha´s Vivências Partilhadas" In Muse India. Goan Literature in Portuguese. Issue 70. Nov-Dec, 2016.

Bibliography
Maria Elsa da Rocha. Vivências Partilhadas. Panjim, India: Third Millennium, 2005.

Portuguese-language writers
Indian women short story writers
Writers from Goa
1924 births
2007 deaths
People from Margao
20th-century Indian short story writers
20th-century Indian women writers
20th-century Indian poets
Women writers from Goa